RFT may refer to:

 Rational Functional Tester, IBM software
 Regulatory focus theory, a psychological theory
 Relational frame theory, a psychological theory
 Remote field testing, a materials testing method with low-frequency AC
 Request for tender, an invitation to product or service suppliers
 Revisable-Form Text, part of IBM's Document Control Architecture (DCA)
 Right-First-Time, a performance indicator in quality management
 The Riverfront Times, an alternative weekly newspaper in St. Louis, Missouri, US